Haathkadi is a 1982 Indian Hindi-language film directed by Surendra Mohan, starring Sanjeev Kumar, Shatrughan Sinha, Reena Roy & Ranjeeta in pivotal role. This movie contains some super hit songs composed by Bappi Lahiri, especially, the song "Disco Station Disco" is one of the most popular & super hit disco songs in Indian film industry.

Plot
Harimohan lives with his wife, Shanta, and his young son named, Sunil. He works for a lecherous male, who would like to have sex with Shanta. One night while Harimohan is sent on an errand, the boss molests Shanta, but due to bad weather, Harimohan returns early just in time to stop his boss from raping Shanta. A fight ensues between his boss and himself, and a result his boss is killed. Harimohan makes a run for it in his boss’ car, which meets with an accident, and he is believed to have been killed. This news devastates Shanta. Years go by, Shanta has got used to living a widow’s life. Sunil has grown up to be a police inspector. Sunil works undercover, and meets with Baldev Mittal, the only son of Gopaldas Mittal. Baldev is rich and arrogant, and as this results in a clash between these two young men. When a young woman, Sunita, is killed, Sunil finds evidence linking her death with Baldev, and he arrests him, and has him tried for murder. What Sunil does not know that Gopaldas Mittal has an alias – that of Saakhia – a notorious and influential gangster who will never let anyone stand in his way. Sunil also does not know that Saakhia is none other than his own biological father, who is still alive, and has taken to a life of crime.

Cast

Sanjeev Kumar as Harimohan / Rai Bahadur Gopaldas Mittal / Saakhiya
Shatrughan Sinha as SP Sunil / Bholanath Banarasi
Rakesh Roshan as Baldev Mittal
Reena Roy as Rosy
Ranjeeta as Sunita
Prem Chopra as Dr. Ramesh
Jeevan as Suraj
Madan Puri as Harimohan's Boss
Simi Garewal as Pammi Mittal
Ramesh Deo as Ambernath
Seema Deo as Shanta 
Mazhar Khan as Robert
Kanhaiyalal as Raghuveer

Songs

References

External links
 

1982 films
1980s Hindi-language films
Films directed by Surendra Mohan